Matching Survival 1+1 is a South Korean reality show distributed by KBS2 airs on Wednesday at 23:10 KST.

Format 
A reality show where contestants will find love in a mart. It is a unique concept where contestants with similar tastes are paired. Contestants who fail to find a match are eliminated making the last two to survive a match.

Host 

 Lee Soo-geun
 Kim Hee-chul
 Soyou
 P.O

List of episodes

Ratings 
In the tables below, the  represent the lowest ratings and the  represent the highest ratings.

References

2019 South Korean television series debuts
2019 South Korean television series endings
Korean-language television shows
Korean Broadcasting System original programming
South Korean variety television shows
Television series by SM C&C